Sandeep Pattnaik (born 17 May 1998) is an Indian cricketer. He made his first-class debut for Odisha in the 2016–17 Ranji Trophy on 6 October 2016. He scored his maiden century in his second match for Odisha on 13 October 2016. He made his Twenty20 debut for Odisha in the 2016–17 Inter State Twenty-20 Tournament on 29 January 2017. He made his List A debut for Odisha in the 2016–17 Vijay Hazare Trophy on 25 February 2017.

References

External links
 

1998 births
Living people
Indian cricketers
Odisha cricketers
Sportspeople from Bhubaneswar
Cricketers from Odisha